George Coventry FRSE (1791–1872) was a Scottish minister of the Church of Scotland and amateur scientist.

Life
He was born on 5 April 1791 the eldest son of Prof Andrew Coventry and his wife. They lived at 29 Moray Place, a huge Georgian townhouse on the Moray Estate. His mother Eliza Hastie died when he was six. His father remarried two years later to Martha Cunningham.

He trained as a minister in the Church of Scotland but there is no record of his ever having preached in a church. Given his great wealth it is likely that there was little incentive to work. He seems to have instead devoted himself to minor dabbling in the sciences.

In 1826 he was elected a Fellow of the Royal Society of Edinburgh. His proposer was Dr George Bell, son of Benjamin Bell.

In 1830 he was living at 11 Windsor Street in Edinburgh. In that year his father died and he inherited the estate of Shanwell in Kinross-shire and other properties. He bought 49 Moray Place, a huge house close to his birthplace.

He lived his later life at 33 Melville Street, a very large townhouse in Edinburgh's affluent West End.

He died on 1 March 1872 and is buried in Dean Cemetery midway along the western wall in the section known as "lords Row".

Family

He was married to Jane Head (1798-1870).

Their daughter Elizabeth married Major Alexander Pringle Scott-Moncrieff son of Robert Scott Moncrieff of Tullibole. They were parents to George Kenneth Scott-Moncrieff.

Artistic recognition

He was portrayed by John Moffat.

References

1791 births
1872 deaths
Scientists from Edinburgh
Scottish landowners
Burials at the Dean Cemetery
Fellows of the Royal Society of Edinburgh
19th-century British businesspeople